Itamar Handelman Smith (Hebrew: איתמר הנדלמן סמית; born May 30, 1976 in the city of Eilat, Israel), also known by his pen name Ithamar Ben-Canaan, is a British writer, columnist, filmmaker, playwright, and DJ based in London. Handelman-Smith publishes his literary and journalistic works in both English and Hebrew.

His latest book Unholy Land, published by Repeater, was released in May 2018. As a documentary filmmaker he's known for Shalom Belfast about Northern Irish factions taking sides in the Israeli–Palestinian conflict.

Handleman is named after Hebrew-language revivalist Itamar Ben-Avi. Via his paternal side Handelman Smith is descendant of 18th-century Hasidic leader grand rabbi Dov Ber of Mezeritch.

Career

Handelman Smith began writing for the Herzliya supplement of Haaretz network at the age of 17. Between the years 1998 and 2003 he wrote a weekly culture critic column in Maariv weekend magazines. During those years he published two volumes of short fiction: Where Have You Gone, Arik Einstein? (1999) and Dreaming of Junk Food (2001).

In 2004 Handelman Smith began writing a more personal weekly column in Time Out Tel Aviv that earned cult status in Israeli culture. In addition to those collections of short stories he produced two volumes of poetry and one controversial novel. Handelman Smith also translated the poetry of Charles Bukowski into Hebrew and edited translations of other American writings.

In 2005 he was a subject of a documentary film, The Ashkenazim.

During 2009 and 2010, while living in Belfast, Northern Ireland, Handelman Smith was commissioned by the Verbal Arts Centre in Derry and the Legacy Trust UK to write a musical titled The Naked Tornado (2011) with young Northern Irish composer Neil Burns. A 30-minute-long piece of the play was staged in Belfast. In early 2012 Handelman Smith's film Shalom Belfast was released and broadcast on BBC Northern Ireland. Since October 2017 Handelman Smith moved back to the UK after living in Paris for almost seven years

Handelman Smith lives with his wife Julia Carolyn Ann Handelman Smith in London and was employed by Ha'ir, a Tel Aviv local newspaper associated with Haaretz as well as Globes (from 2013). His columns often provoked Israeli mainstream. In 2011 his piece concerning the Sephardic Jewish Israeli singer Margalit Tzan'ani was the cause of great controversies and even allegations of racism.

Bibliography
1999 – Where Have You Gone, Arik Einstein?
2001 – Dreaming of Junk Food
2002 – Like Those Dogs Who Die of Sorrow when Their Owners Take Off for the Weekend
2004 – Open
2014 – The British Detective, published by Keter Publishing House
2017- "Before the Sun", published by Keter Publishing house
2018- "Unholy Land: An Unconventional Guide to Israel" published by Repeater

See also
Dahn Ben-Amotz
Itamar Ben-Avi
Nimrod Kamer
Yoram Kaniuk
Stilyaga

References

External links
"Erotic Novel from Israel" on Itamar Handelman Smith from the Czech website *expats.cz.
The Ashkenazim in the Vancouver Jewish Film Festival
More info in Michal Govrin's official website
An Essay in the jewish agency website
Views on Berlin Haaretz, March 2012.
How the Irish View the Israel-Palestinian Conflict, on Handelman's Belfast documentary, Haaretz, Oct 19, 2012

1976 births
Living people
Israeli journalists
Jewish novelists
Israeli male short story writers
Israeli short story writers
21st-century Israeli poets
Israeli erotica writers
Israeli male poets
20th-century male writers
21st-century male writers
Male novelists
Israeli Jews
Israeli expatriates in the United Kingdom
Israeli documentary filmmakers